Paguate is a census-designated place (CDP) in Cibola County, New Mexico,  United States. The population was 421 at the 2010 census.

Geography
Paguate is located in northeastern Cibola County at  (35.137298, -107.370921), within the lands of Laguna Pueblo. It is bordered to the west by Encinal and to the north by Bibo and Moquino.

Demographics

As of the census of 2000, there were 474 people, 148 households, and 113 families residing in the CDP. The population density was 64.0 people per square mile (24.7/km). There were 183 housing units at an average density of 24.7 per square mile (9.5/km). The racial makeup of the CDP was 1.27% White, 97.68% Native American, and 1.05% from two or more races. Hispanic or Latino of any race were 1.48% of the population.

There were 148 households, out of which 34.5% had children under the age of 18 living with them, 39.2% were married couples living together, 33.8% had a female householder with no husband present, and 23.0% were non-families. 22.3% of all households were made up of individuals, and 8.1% had someone living alone who was 65 years of age or older. The average household size was 3.20 and the average family size was 3.74.

In the CDP, the population was spread out, with 29.7% under the age of 18, 10.5% from 18 to 24, 26.2% from 25 to 44, 20.7% from 45 to 64, and 12.9% who were 65 years of age or older. The median age was 34 years. For every 100 females, there were 80.2 males. For every 100 females age 18 and over, there were 78.1 males.

The median income for a household in the CDP was $22,417, and the median income for a family was $24,519. Males had a median income of $20,313 versus $16,563 for females. The per capita income for the CDP was $9,657. About 26.6% of families and 28.4% of the population were below the poverty line, including 33.6% of those under age 18 and 37.8% of those age 65 or over.

Education
All public schools in the county are operated by Grants/Cibola County Schools.

References

Laguna Pueblo
Census-designated places in Cibola County, New Mexico
Census-designated places in New Mexico